Chaetomymar is a genus of fairyflies within the family Mymaridae with 9 species currently assigned.

Species 

 Chaetomymar bagicha 
 Chaetomymar dei 
 Chaetomymar gracile 
 Chaetomymar hishimoni 
 Chaetomymar indopeninsularis 
 Chaetomymar kusnezovi 
 Chaetomymar lepidum 
 Chaetomymar sophoniae 
 Chaetomymar tayalum

References 

Mymaridae